717 may refer to:
 717 BC: a year.
 717: a year.
 Boeing 717
 Boeing 717, an airliner, the former MD-95
 Boeing 720, an airliner designated as the 717 during development
 Boeing C-135 Stratolifter, internal Boeing product code of 717
 717 (number): a number.
 Area code 717, for telephones in southern Pennsylvania under the North American Numbering Plan
British Rail Class 717, a train for services from London's Moorgate station